Camaret-sur-Mer is a commune in the Finistère department in northwestern France, located at the end of Crozon peninsula.

Sights

Camaret-sur-Mer is home to the Tour Vauban or Tour dorée (lit. "Golden Tower"), a historic fortification guarding the harbor and built in 1669–94. In 2008, the Tour dorée was listed as a UNESCO World Heritage Site, as part of the "Fortifications of Vauban" group.

Camaret also is home to a marina and some beaches.

Population
Inhabitants of Camaret-sur-Mer are called Camarétois.

Map

Twinning
Camaret-sur-Mer is twinned with St Ives, Cornwall, UK.

See also
Communes of the Finistère department
Saint-Pol-Roux
Parc naturel régional d'Armorique
"List of the works of Charles Cottet depicting scenes of Brittany"

References

External links
 Official website

 more than 500 photos of the Crozon Peninsula

Communes of Finistère
Port cities and towns on the French Atlantic coast
Seaside resorts in France